The Roman Catholic Diocese of Laval (Latin: Dioecesis Valleguidonensis; French: Diocèse de Laval) is a Roman Catholic Latin Rite diocese in France. The episcopal see is Laval Cathedral in the city of Laval.  Created in June 1855, the diocese was originally erected from the Diocese of Le Mans, and corresponds to the department of Mayenne. Under the Ancien Régime the diocese of Mans had an Archdeacon of Laval, whose responsibilities extended over the deaneries of Ernée, Évrun, Laval and Mayenne. The diocese is a suffragan of the Archdiocese of Rennes, Dol, and Saint-Malo.

The current bishop is Thierry Scherrer, appointed in 2008. On 10 April 2017 he announced the first diocesan synod ever to be held in Mayenne, to commence on 23 May. In 2013 there was one priest for every 1,780 Catholics.

History
At the beginning of the Revolution, the Constituent Assembly decided that the number of dioceses in France was excessive, and that approximately fifty of them could be eliminated. Those that survived would have their boundaries changed to coincide with new departmental subdivisions of France. This was contrary to Canon Law, which reserved the creation and suppression of dioceses, as well as the appointment and transfer (translation) of bishops to the Pope. In creating the new department of Mayenne, the French government produced a territory in which there was no established bishopric. The very large former diocese of Mans (now called Sarthe) was divided, and the western half given to the diocese of Mayenne, situated at Laval. A new Metropolitanate was created (the Métropole du Nord-Ouest), with its center at Rennes, embracing the department-dioceses of Ille-et-Vilaine, Côtes du Nord, Finistère, Loire-Inférieure, Maine-et-Loire, Mayenne, Morbihan, and Sarthe.

In March 1791 the electors of the Department of Mayenne met to elect a constitutional bishop. These electors did not need to be active members of the Roman Catholic Church, nor even Christians. The election, therefore, was blasphemous and schismatic. The office of bishop was first offered to Abbé de Vauponts, the Vicar General of the (former) diocese of Dol. After some hesitation, he refused, and won a commendation from Pope Pius VI. On 20 March, the electors then turned to Father Noel-Gabriel-Luce Villar, a native of Toulouse and teacher of rhetoric at the Collège de Toulouse, and then principal of the Collège de la Flèche. He was consecrated in Paris by the Constitutional Bishop Jean-Baptiste Gobel on 22 May 1791. Gobel had been consecrated titular Bishop of Lydda in 1772, and therefore the consecration of Villar was valid, though uncanonical and schismatic. The new bishop returned to Laval, and was installed in the church of la Trinité, which served as a cathedral for the Constitutionals. Only twenty-two ecclesiastics signed the record. Villar participated in the Legislative Assembly, and voted King Louis XVI guilty, though not requiring the death penalty. In 1794, when Reason replaced Religion in France, he abandoned his ecclesiastical activities and no longer said Mass. He did not resign his bishopric, however, until 3 October 1798, under pressure from his Metropolitan, Bishop Le Coz. He died on 26 August 1826.

In October 1798 Bishop Le Coz was able to authorize an election, by the priests of Mayenne, to provide a successor to Bishop Villar. They chose Charles François Dorlodot (or D'Orlodot), the curé of the church of S. Vénérand in Laval, and Bishop Le Coz confirmed the election on 6 February 1799. Dorlodot was consecrated at Laval by Le Coz and the constitutional bishops of Saint-Brieuc and Vannes on 7 April 1799. He took part in the provincial council held by Le Coz in Rennes, and then in the national council held in Paris in 1800. On November 29, 1801, by the bull Qui Christi Domini, Pope Pius VII suppressed all of the Roman Catholic dioceses in France, and reinstituted them under papal authority. The Constitutional Diocese of Mayenne (Laval) was ignored by the Vatican, which had played no part in its existence. In 1802 the French government suppressed the diocese of Mayenne (Laval), and Dordolot was named a Canon of Mans. He continued to reside in Laval, however, and found employment as librarian of the École Central until 1810, when he followed his patron Le Coz to Besançon. He died in Besançon on 3 January 1816.

In 1846 the creation of the new diocese was decided upon, but was not carried out until after the death of Bishop Jean-Baptiste Bouvier of Le Mans on 29 December 1854. A Bull of Pope Pius IX, June 30, 1855, established the See of Laval. The apologist Emile Bougaud was consecrated Bishop of Laval in February 1888, and died a few months later. The request of the Holy See in 1904 for the resignation of Bishop Pierre-Joseph Geay (1896-1904) was one of the reasons assigned by the French Republic for breaking with the pope and preparing the separation of Church and State.

In August 1859 Bishop Casimir-Alexis-Joseph Wicart held a diocesan synod in the église S. Michel in Laval. Bishop Grellier held a synod in November 1913.

Bishops of Laval 

 Casimir-Alexis-Joseph Wicart - (1855–1876)
 Jules-Denis-Marie-Dieudonné Le Hardy du Marais - (25 June 1876 – 1886) 
 Victor Maréchal - appointed 1887 – died on 21 September 1887
 Louis-Victor-Emile Bougaud - (25 November 1887 – 1888)
 Jules Cléret - 1889–1895
 Pierre-Joseph Geay - (25 June 1896 – 30 August 1904)
 Eugène-Jacques Grellier - (21 February 1906 – 15 June 1936) 
 Joseph-Jean-Yves Marcadé - (1936–1938) 
 Paul-Marie-André Richaud - (27 July 1938 – 10 February 1950)
 Maurice-Paul-Jules Rousseau - (14 June 1950 – 28 February 1962) 
 Charles-Marie-Jacques Guilhem - 1962–1969 
 Paul-Louis Carrière - 1969–1984
 Louis-Marie Billé - (10 March 1984 – 5 May 1995) 
 Armand Maillard - (2 August 1996 – 11 September 2007)
 Thierry Scherrer - 2008–

Sources
  Centre national des Archives de l'Église de France, L’Épiscopat francais depuis 1919, retrieved: 2016-12-24.
  Diocese of Laval official website

See also 
 Catholic Church in France

References 

Sources

External links
  Centre national des Archives de l'Église de France, L’Épiscopat francais depuis 1919, retrieved: 2016-12-24.

Mayenne
Laval
Religious organizations established in 1855
1855 establishments in France